SUPER-UX is a version of the Unix operating system from NEC that is used on its SX series of supercomputers.

History
The initial version of SUPER-UX was based on UNIX System V version 3.1 with features from BSD 4.3. The version for the NEC SX-9 was based on SVR4.2MP with BSD enhancements.

Features
SUPER-UX is a 64-bit UNIX operating system. It supports the Supercomputer File System (SFS).

Earth Simulator
The Earth Simulator uses a custom OS called "ESOS" (Earth Simulator Operating System) based on SUPER-UX. It has many enhanced features custom designed for the Earth Simulator which are not in the regular SUPER-UX OS.

See also
 EWS-UX

References

External links
NEC Europe HPC
NEC Japan HPC
Official NEC SUPER-UX page, Archived 6 May 2008

UNIX System V
NEC supercomputers
Supercomputer operating systems